Romi Ropati (born 20 June 1976 in Auckland, New Zealand) is a retired rugby union player best known for his time with the Highlanders Super Rugby franchise. Although born in New Zealand, he represented Samoa internationally and was a member of the Samoan squad at the 2003 Rugby World Cup. He is the Coach of Tahiti's Mens National Rugby Union Team.

Playing career

Ropati is a member of a famous rugby league family and he had three older brothers who played internationally for the New Zealand Kiwis (Joe, Tea and Iva). However, he chose to pursue a career in rugby union, and made his provincial debut for Auckland in 1996 as part of a squad which would win the National Provincial Championship.

Ropati was then one of a group of Auckland players (including future All Black Kees Meeuws) who transferred south to join Otago and the Highlanders for 1997. The move was a fruitful one as Ropati became a fixture in both sides for the next 5 seasons, winning the NPC again with Otago in 1998 in a year in which he scored 12 tries from 13 matches. With the Highlanders, he became one of the franchise's most-capped backs, leaving on exactly 50 appearances following the 2002 Super 12 season.

In 2003, Ropati left New Zealand to begin a two-year stint in the Japanese Top League with Toyota Verblitz. He then moved to France to join Castres Olympique in 2006, before joining Pro D2 outfit US Colomiers for the following season.

Ropati returned to New Zealand in 2008 to close out his career with Counties Manukau in that year's Air New Zealand Cup.

International career

Ropati played for New Zealand age group sides but was never called up to the All Blacks. Eligible to play for Samoa, he was included in their squad for the 2003 Rugby World Cup and made his debut on 1 November in a 60–10 defeat to South Africa.

This looked to be his sole international appearance until he was a surprise inclusion in the Samoan squad selected to play New Zealand in New Plymouth on 3 September 2008, almost 5 years after his debut. He came on as a substitute in a 101–14 defeat.

External links

1976 births
Living people
Auckland rugby union players
Expatriate rugby union players in France
Expatriate rugby union players in Japan
Highlanders (rugby union) players
New Zealand expatriate rugby union players
New Zealand expatriate sportspeople in France
New Zealand expatriate sportspeople in Japan
New Zealand rugby union players
Otago rugby union players
Romi
Rugby union wings
Samoa international rugby union players